Valentin Mazinot (born February 14, 1982) is a Malagasy footballer currently plays for USCA Foot in Analamanga.

External links
 

1982 births
Living people
Malagasy footballers
Madagascar international footballers
Association football central defenders
Léopards de Transfoot players
USCA Foot players